Martin Černek (born 30 December 1994) is a Slovak professional footballer who plays as a defender for MFK Skalica in the Fortuna Liga.

Club career

MFK Skalica
Černek made his professional Fortuna Liga debut for MFK Skalica on 17 July 2022 against MFK Ružomberok.

References

External links
 MFK Skalica official club profile 
 
 
 Futbalnet profile 

1994 births
Living people
Sportspeople from Skalica
Slovak footballers
Association football defenders
MFK Skalica players
2. Liga (Slovakia) players
Slovak Super Liga players